Alizée Agier (born 7 July 1994) is a French karateka. She won the gold medal in the women's kumite 68 kg event at the 2014 World Karate Championships held in Bremen, Germany. She also won the gold medal in this event at the 2019 European Karate Championships held in Guadalajara, Spain.

Career 

She won one of the bronze medals in the women's kumite 68 kg event at the 2013 Mediterranean Games held in Mersin, Turkey. She won the gold medal in her event at the 2014 World Karate Championships held in Bremen, Germany.

In 2016, she won a medal in the women's team kumite event at the European Karate Championships in Montpellier, France and the World Karate Championships in Linz, Austria. She won one of the bronze medals in this event at the 2016 European Karate Championships and the gold medal in this event at the 2016 World Karate Championships.  She also won the gold medal in the women's 68 kg event at the 2016 World University Karate Championships held in Braga, Portugal. She won the silver medal in the women's kumite 68 kg event at the 2017 European Karate Championships held in İzmit, Turkey. She also won one of the bronze medals in the women's team kumite event.

She won the gold medal in the women's kumite 68 kg event at the 2019 European Karate Championships held in Guadalajara, Spain. In the same year, she competed in the women's kumite 68 kg event at the European Games held in Minsk, Belarus. She won one of three matches in the elimination round and she did not advance to compete in the semi-finals.

In June 2021, she competed at the World Olympic Qualification Tournament held in Paris, France hoping to qualify for the 2020 Summer Olympics in Tokyo, Japan. In November 2021, she won one of the bronze medals in the women's 68 kg event at the World Karate Championships held in Dubai, United Arab Emirates. She also won the silver medal in the women's team kumite event.

She won one of the bronze medals in the women's 68 kg event at the 2022 European Karate Championships held in Gaziantep, Turkey. She also won one of the bronze medals in the women's team kumite event. She won the bronze medal in the women's 68 kg event at the 2022 World Games held in Birmingham, United States. She defeated Irina Zaretska of Azerbaijan in her bronze medal match. She was also flag bearer for France during the opening ceremony of the 2022 World Games.

Personal life 

She was diagnosed at age 19 with type 1 diabetes.

Achievements

References

External links 
 

Living people
1994 births
Place of birth missing (living people)
French female karateka
Karateka at the 2019 European Games
European Games competitors for France
Competitors at the 2013 Mediterranean Games
Mediterranean Games bronze medalists for France
Mediterranean Games medalists in karate
Competitors at the 2022 World Games
World Games bronze medalists
World Games medalists in karate
People with type 1 diabetes
21st-century French women